Alania is a monotypic genus of  flowering plants in the family Boryaceae, endemic to the State of New South Wales in Australia.

The single species is Alania cunninghamii.

References

Boryaceae
Asparagales of Australia
Endemic flora of Australia
Flora of New South Wales
Plants described in 1840